The 1929 Coupe de France Final was a football match held at Stade Olympique Yves-du-Manoir, Colombes on May 5, 1929, that saw SO Montpellier defeat FC Sète 2–0 thanks to goals by Auguste Kramer and Edmond Kramer.

Match details

See also
Coupe de France 1928-1929

External links
Coupe de France results at Rec.Sport.Soccer Statistics Foundation
Report on French federation site

Coupe
1929
Coupe De France Final 1929
Coupe De France Final 1929
Sport in Hauts-de-Seine
May 1929 sports events
1929 in Paris